Leptorchestes is a genus of jumping spiders in the family Salticidae. As in several other genera of salticids, it mimicks ants.

Species
 Leptorchestes algerinus Wesołowska & Szeremeta, 2001 – Algeria
 Leptorchestes berolinensis (C. L. Koch, 1846) – Europe to Turkmenistan
 Leptorchestes mutilloides (Lucas, 1846) – Southern Europe, Algeria
 Leptorchestes peresi (Simon, 1868) – Mediterranean
 Leptorchestes separatus Wesołowska & Szeremeta, 2001 – Namibia
 Leptorchestes sikorskii Prószyński, 2000 – Lebanon, Israel

References
  (2009): The world spider catalog, version 9.5. American Museum of Natural History.

Further reading
  (2001): A revision of the ant like salticid genera Enoplomischus Giltay, 1931, Kima Peckham & Peckham, 1902 and Leptorchestes Thorell, 1870 (Araneae, Salticidae). Insect Systematic & Evolution 32(2): 217-240.

External links
Photograph of L. berolinensis
Photograph of L. mutilloides

Salticidae
Spiders of Europe
Spiders of Africa
Spiders of Asia
Salticidae genera